Peblephaeus nobuoi is a species of beetle in the family Cerambycidae. It was described by Stephan von Breuning and Ohbayashi in 1966, originally under the genus Blepephaeus. It is known from Japan.

References

Lamiini
Beetles described in 1966